{{DISPLAYTITLE:C6H8O4}}
The molecular formula C6H8O4 may refer to:

 Dimethyl fumarate (DMF)
 Dimethyl maleate
 Meldrum's acid, or 2,2-dimethyl-1,3-dioxane-4,6-dione
 3-Methylglutaconic acid
 Lactide

Molecular formulas